Karchevan is a village in the Meghri Municipality of the Syunik Province in Armenia.

The village is located in the southern part of the Syunik Province, a short distance from the Aras River - the main tributary of the Kura River, which forms the border with Iran and the Nakhchivan Autonomous Republic of Azerbaijan.

Demographics 
The Statistical Committee of Armenia reported its population was 292 in 2010, down from 353 at the 2001 census.

History  
The village of Karchevan was first mentioned in the 10th century AD. According to the Geographical and Statistical Dictionary of the Russian Empire, published in 1865, 260 people lived in the village at that time. In addition, there was an old Armenian church, and nearby the village was the monastery of St. Stepanos.  The settlement has the Surb Astvatsatsin Church (12th century) and the ruins of the monastery of St. Stepanos. In the vicinity of the village are the ruins of the Karchevan fortress as well as old cemeteries and tombs. During the Russian Empire, Karchevan was part of the Nakhichevan uezd of the Erivan Governorate.

Culture 
The locals speak a special Karchevan dialect of the Eastern Armenian language, similar to that spoken in Meghri and formerly in Agulis.

Gallery

References 

Populated places in Syunik Province